Mary Elizabeth Kathleen Dulcie Deamer (13 December 1890 – 16 August 1972) was a New Zealand-born Australian novelist, poet, journalist and actor. She was a founder and committee member of the Fellowship of Australian Writers.

Life
Deamer was born in Christchurch, New Zealand, daughter of George Edwin Deamer, a physician from Lincolnshire, and his New Zealand-born wife, Mable Reader. She was taught at home by her mother, who had been a governess. She married Albert Goldie, a theatrical agent, in Perth, Australia, on 27 August 1908. She bore six children, but separated from Goldie in 1922.

Career

In the 1920–30s Dulcie Deamer was a poet, playwright and author in Sydney, where she was Australia's first female boxing reporter.

Deamer was known as the "Queen of Bohemia" due to her involvement with Norman Lindsay's literary and artistic circle, the Bohemian world of Kings Cross, Sydney, and vaudeville. During the inter-war years, many balls were held in Sydney, including those known as the "Artists' Balls" which had been held as far back as the 1880s. Dulcie Deamer attended every Artists' Ball for 30 years. The leopard-skin costume with dog-tooth necklace that she wore to the 1923 Artists' Ball in Sydney "has come to symbolise the joie de vivre of the decade, despite Deamer's own protest regarding its relevance."

The balls regularly made the newspapers and behaviour at the 1924 Ball, which Dulcie referred to as "The Night of the Great Scandal", resulted in the introduction of restrictions on alcohol and a greater police presence for subsequent events.

Hooligans took control of Sydney Town Hall basement during the progress of the Artists' Ball on Friday night, and had to be ejected by the police. Prior to this two persons had to be arrested for drunkenness, and two as being suspected persons. Several free fights developed, and many persons were injured when beer bottles were thrown. The Inspector-General of Police agrees that there were many instances of unseemly conduct. He attributes them to unlimited supplies of liquor and lack of efficient control.
Queanbeyan Age and Queanbeyan Observer2 September 1924

A modern critic has noted that Deamer's work "demonstrates a fascination with religion, mythology and classical literature (typical of associates such as Norman Lindsay, Rosaleen Norton and Hugh McCrae) and is characteristically ornamental in style." Poems written by Deamer appeared in the souvenir program of the 1924 ball along with those of Kenneth Slessor.

Literary works
Novels
 The Suttee of Safa (New York, 1913)
 Revelation (London, 1921)
 The Street of the Gazelle (London, 1922)
 The Devil's Saint (London, 1924)
 As It Was in the Beginning (Melbourne, 1929)
 Holiday (1940)

Plays
 That by which Men Live (1936)
 Victory (1938)

Poetry
 Messalina (1932)
 The Silver Branch (1948)

Death
Deamer died at the Little Sisters of the Poor, Randwick, New South Wales, aged 81. She had written an unpublished autobiography in the 1960s, later published in 1998. Her daughter, the theologian Rosemary Goldie, died at Randwick as well, three decades later.

References

Sources

 See p. 15.

External links

 
 Dulcie Deamer's Australian theatre credits at AusStage
  [CC-By-SA]

1890 births
1972 deaths
20th-century Australian novelists
Australian women novelists
Australian women poets
People from Christchurch
People from New South Wales
Australian women dramatists and playwrights
20th-century Australian poets
20th-century Australian dramatists and playwrights
20th-century Australian women writers
19th-century Australian women